Holland Park is a London Underground station, on Holland Park Avenue. It is served by the Central line, lying between Shepherd's Bush and Notting Hill Gate stations, in Travelcard Zone 2.

History
The original building was typical of those designed by Harry Bell Measures for the stations of the Central London Railway that opened on 30 July 1900. It was given a flat roof in the hope that commercial development would take place on top, as at Queensway station, but so far this has not happened. The building was refurbished in the 1990s.

On 28 July 1958 one passenger died as a result of a fire on a Central line train at Holland Park. There was an incident in August 2013 in which smoke started to fill the station after a train's brakes malfunctioned.

The station today
The tube station is named after Holland Park, a park in west London, although the term also refers to the residential area to the north of the park.

The station was closed for lift replacement works and refurbishment from 2 January 2016 until it reopened in August of the same year. This station was the last of the deep level underground stations to retain the original 1950s signage until the refurbishment.

Connections
London Buses routes 31, 94, 148, 228 and N207 serve the station.

Gallery

References

External links
 London Transport Museum Photographic Archive
 
 
 

Central line (London Underground) stations
London Underground Night Tube stations
Tube stations in the Royal Borough of Kensington and Chelsea
Former Central London Railway stations
Holland Park
Railway stations in Great Britain opened in 1900